Ta' Għemmuna Battery was an artillery battery in St. Julian's, Malta, that was built by Maltese insurgents during the French blockade of 1798–1800. The battery was located at Dragonara Point, in front of the Hospitaller entrenchments at Spinola. The battery had a large parapet with nine embrasures and a magazine. It was armed with seven guns, which had been taken from St. Mary's Tower and St. Paul's Bay.

The battery was built by Vincenzo Borg in February 1799, after a French force of around 30 ships was sighted close to the Maltese coast. The battery was built to prevent a French relief force from landing at St. Julian's Bay and St. George's Bay, therefore protecting other insurgent positions from the rear. The battery had a hexagonal parapet design which was designed by Francesco Sammut on payment by Borg. A rough sketch of the battery by Sammut still exists and was retrieved by Architect Andre Zammit.

The battery still existed in 1811, but it was eventually demolished. Its site is now occupied by the Dragonara Palace, which was built in 1870 and is now a casino.

References

Batteries in Malta
St. Julian's, Malta
Military installations established in 1799
Demolished buildings and structures in Malta
French occupation of Malta
Vernacular architecture in Malta
Limestone buildings in Malta
1799 establishments in Malta
18th-century fortifications
18th Century military history of Malta